Julia St John is an English actress. Her television credits include A Touch of Frost, The Brittas Empire, Agatha Christie's Poirot, Lovejoy, Minder, Harry Enfield and Chums, Lewis, and Victoria Wood, appearing in the episode Over To Pam.

Stage
Ludmilla in Alasdair Gray's McGrotty and Ludmilla at Tron Theatre (1986)
Natasha in Chekhov's Three Sisters at the Minerva Theatre, Chichester (1994)
Regan in King Lear directed by Peter Cheeseman at New Vic Theatre (1996)
Lady Pembroke in Alan Bennett's The Madness of George III at West Yorkshire Playhouse (2003)
Maya in Arthur Miller's The Archbishop's Ceiling at the Southwark Playhouse (2004)
Sheila in Charlotte Keatley's Our Father at Watford Palace Theatre (2012)
Mrs Lintott in Alan Bennett's The History Boys at the Sheffield Crucible (2013)
Martha/Nelly Rose in Jefferson's Garden at Watford Palace Theatre (2015)
 Mrs Cotton in "I Capture the Castle" musical at Watford Palace Theatre and Octagon Theatre Bolton (2017)
 Mrs Malaprop in "The Rivals" at the Watermill Theatre in Bagnor, Newbury (2018)

Selected film and television roles
Charles & Diana: A Royal Love Story (1982) – as Jane Ward
Victoria Wood, Over to Pam (1989) – as Caroline
 The Blackheath Poisonings (1992) – as Beatrice Vandervent
Lovejoy, The Colour of Mary (1993) – as Rosemary
The Brittas Empire (1991–1994) – as Laura Lancing
 Searching (1995) – as Chancy
Agatha Christie's Poirot – Dumb Witness (1996) – as Bella Tanios
Princess in Love (1996) – as Camilla Parker Bowles
The Grand (1997–1998) – as Sarah Bannerman
Harry Enfield and Chums (1997) – as Arguing Wife / David's Mother
Brand Spanking New Show (2000) – as Various characters
High Stakes, The Poacher (2001) – as Christabel Webster
A Touch of Frost (3 episodes, 2003; 2005; 2010) – as Pathologist Amanda Chase
Doc Martin, Blood Is Thicker (2005) – as Sandra Mylow
Julian Fellowes Investigates: A Most Mysterious Murder – The Case of the Earl of Erroll (2005) – as Gwladys Delamere
The Line of Beauty (2006) – as Greta Timms
Casualty (2006–2011) – as Dr. Sarah Evans
Lewis, And the Moonbeams Kiss the Sea (2008) – as Naomi Norris

Radio
Legal Affairs (1996) five-part series on BBC Radio 4

References

External links

Living people
English television actresses
Year of birth missing (living people)